Yun Hui-chun (born July 1, 1964) is a South Korean sprint canoer who competed in the mid-1980s. At the 1984 Summer Olympics in Los Angeles, he was eliminated in the repechages of the C-1 500 m event and the semifinals of the C-2 500 m event.

External links

1964 births
Canoeists at the 1984 Summer Olympics
Living people
Olympic canoeists of South Korea
South Korean male canoeists
Korea National Sport University alumni